Farm Credit Dairy Center is an 8,000-seat indoor multipurpose arena located in Tulare, California.  It is part of the Heritage Complex, which is the site of the World Ag Expo.  The arena contains no permanent seats; however portable stands can be brought in for sporting events, concerts, boxing, professional wrestling and graduation ceremonies.  Conventions and trade shows are also held here.  It is the largest arena in the Visalia area.

The arena contains  of space.  A giant American flag is suspended above the stage end of the arena.  As of December 2010, it is the only arena of its size between Fresno and Bakersfield.

References

External links
Heritage Complex at the International Agricenter

Boxing venues in California
Buildings and structures in Tulare, California
Indoor arenas in California